Southern California University may refer to: 

 California Southern University, a correspondence school founded in 1978 as the "Southern California University for Professional Studies"
 University of Southern California, founded in 1880